The Utakura River is a river of the Northland Region of New Zealand's North Island. It flows west from its sources northwest of Kaikohe, reaching the Waihou River at the point where it widens to become an arm of the Hokianga Harbour.

Long and short-fin eels, smelt, īnanga, torrentfish and redfin bully live in the river. The river is assessed as fair, in a scale between good and poor, as it  suffers from turbidity and e-coli and phosphorus pollution.

See also
List of rivers of New Zealand

References

External links

Far North District
Rivers of the Northland Region
Rivers of New Zealand